The 2022 Valorant Champions Tour (VCT): Stage 2 Masters, also known as the Valorant Copenhagen Masters 2022, was an international esports tournament organized by Riot Games for the first-person shooter game Valorant, as part of the Valorant Champions Tour's 2022 competitive season. The tournament ran from July 10–24, 2022 in Copenhagen, Denmark.

Venue
Copenhagen was the city chosen to host the competition. All matches were played at Forum Copenhagen.

Qualification and format
Similar with the previous Masters, the champion teams from the Asia-Pacific; EMEA (Europe, the Middle East and Africa) and North America Stage 2 Challengers were all directly qualified to the upper bracket quarterfinals. Which of the two regions Latin America and Brazil win the South America Playoff (the match between two runner-up teams from Challengers of twos) will get quarterfinals spot for their Challengers winner. The remaining eight teams were seeded in the GSL formatted group stage and were divided into two groups of four teams.

Group stage

Group A

Group B

Playoffs
All seeded teams and the teams qualified from the group stage qualified for the knockout playoffs. All matches were in a  series, except for the Lower Bracket Final and the Grand Finals, which were in a  series.

Final standings

Source:

Notes

References

2022 in esports
2022 first-person shooter tournaments
Valorant competitions